Olympe was an ancient city located in the territory of the Amantes, between northern Epirus and southern Illyria in classical antiquity. It is located in modern day Mavrovë, Vlorë County, Albania.

History 

The settlement at Olympe was fortified between the late 5th century BC and the early 4th century BC.

Taking into account archaeological and historical considerations, the city of Olympe should have been founded in the ethnic context of the Amantes, but later it was organized as a proper polis turning away from its ethnic context. The dissociation from the ethnic to the polis coincided with Philip V of Macedon's conquest of a number of cities in Illyria.

In the Hellenistic period there is evidence for the polis status of Olympe, and Stephanus of Byzantium ( 6th century AD) recorded Olympe as a "polis of Illyria" (πόλις Ίλλυρίας). During the 3rd and 2nd centuries BC Olympe minted bronze coins bearing the inscription ΟΛΥΜΠΑΣΤΑΝ (OLYMPASTAN), and the city-ethnic was probably ’Ολυμπαστάς (Olympastas). The coins of Olympe depict a snake, the totemistic symbol among Illyrians. The same symbol is depicted in ancient Scodra, Byllis, Amantia and other major settlements. A late 3rd century BC dedication to Zeus Megistos mentions a politarches, a grammateus and the synarchontes.

See also
List of settlements in Illyria
List of cities in ancient Epirus

References

Sources

Cities in ancient Epirus
Illyrian Albania
Hellenistic Albania
Archaeological sites in Albania
Populated places in ancient Epirus
Former populated places in the Balkans